In Colorado, State Highway 85 may refer to:
U.S. Route 85 in Colorado, the only Colorado highway numbered 85 since 1968
Colorado State Highway 85 (1923) northeast of Colorado Springs
Colorado State Highway 85 (1938-1953) west of Steamboat Springs